The Rye and Camber Tramway was an English railway in East Sussex. It was of  narrow gauge, relatively unusual amongst British narrow gauge railways. It operated from 1895 until 1939, connecting Rye to the coast. It operated mainly to transport golfers to the golf links and holidaymakers to the coastal dunes.

History

The railway was constructed between January and July 1895 and ran entirely on private land. It was the first designed by consulting engineer Holman F. Stephens, who went on to build and run small railways all over the Country.

The line was built to convey golfers to the Rye Golf Club and ran from Rye (R&CT) station to the golf club. In 1908 the first extension to Camber Sands station was opened and the intermediate station renamed "Golf Links". Camber Sands terminal was moved to a more accessible site and a tea hut was opened at the end of summer 1938, but this only used for a few months as the war intervened the next year.

Although initially quite successful, increasing competition from automobile and bus transport eventually caused the tramway to enter a gradual economic decline, as was the case with many small railways. Passenger service was ended at the outbreak of World War II but it was extensively used by the Government to convey parts for the P.L.U.T.O. (Pipe Line Under The Ocean) project for which a special siding leading to a new pier near Golf Links Station was constructed by Canadian troops.

The line was in such a run-down a condition by the end of the war that it was deemed irrecoverable and was sold for scrap in 1947. The Rye & Camber Tramways Co. Ltd was liquidated in February 1949.

Remains

A number of relics, including the frame and bogies of one of the carriages, can be seen at the Colonel Stephens Museum at Tenterden.

Golf Links station building survives virtually intact. Some track is embedded in concrete near the station as the trackbed was used as a roadway during wartime. Most of the route is a footpath, although a short section has been destroyed by gravel workings.

The line plays a prominent part in several novels by Rye resident E.F. Benson.

Rolling stock

Locomotives

There were two small Bagnall steam locomotives, "Camber" and "Victoria", but in later years a small petrol locomotive was used exclusively.

Carriages 

The tramway had two enclosed carriages, one built by Bagnall and the other by The Rother Iron Works, Rye. Two four-wheel wagons were also fitted with seats for passengers and several locally-built four-wheel wagons were used to convey sand from the beach for local builders. Several temporary sidings were constructed at the Camber end for this purpose, where the dug-out dunes can still be seen.

See also
British narrow gauge railways

References

Sources

Further reading

External links
 Colonel Stephens Museum R&C page
 A Talk on the Camber Tram by Ken Clark
 Colonel Stephens Society R&C page

History of East Sussex
Rail transport in East Sussex
3 ft gauge railways in England
Rother District
Railway lines opened in 1895
Closed railway lines in South East England
Railway lines closed in 1939
HF Stephens